Come Home Love: Dinner at 8 (literally "Love Returning Home, Seated at 8") is a 2016 daily half-hour Hong Kong sitcom created by TVB and produced by Law Chun-ngok who also produced the two previous Come Home Love. Filming began in March 2016 and will be filmed as it airs. The series premiered on April 4, 2016, airing every Monday to Friday on Hong Kong's TVB Jade, Malaysia's Astro Wah Lai Toi and Australia's TVBJ channels during its 8:00-8:30 pm timeslot, with an expected 120 episodes. As at August 17, 2016, it is announced that the episodes to be increased to 200.

Come Home Love: Dinner at 8 is an indirect sequel to the previous two series that shares the "Come Home Love" title. Unlike the second Come Home Love which spawned off from the first series with a few returning characters from the first series to tie the two series together, Come Home Love: Dinner at 8 has no connections to the two previous series that shares part of the same title. The only returning cast member from the previous series Florence Kwok, plays a completely different character in Come Home Love: Dinner at 8. The Come Home Love was added to the title of the new sitcom as TVB was bittersweet to see the long running highly rated series come to an end 

The series revolves around employees of a fictional Hong Kong television station and their personal family life.

Synopsis
TVI's (Television International) Senior Manager of accounting Lam Siu-siu (Teresa Mo) meets TVI's Director of production Koo Hiu-san (Wayne Lai) when he calls her into a meeting, asking why none of his requested work equipment has been approved for budget. Siu-siu calmly explains that due to errors his assistant Tong Chong-shu (Mark Ma) had in filing the paperwork, they missed the deadline before the fiscal quarter ends, and the account department will not approve any new budget request. Hiu-san, who has a reputation as a mean boss, demands to have the issue resolved right away, but Siu-siu tells him to schedule another meeting with her as it is late and nearly time to end work. Unimpressed with rationale, Hiu-san mocks Siu-siu for leaving work with the issue unresolved. Hiu-san's comments backfire when Siu-siu mocks him back by hinting that his department is unorganized and then telling him the available executive secretary position in his department has been unfilled for so long because no one wants to work for him.

Hiu-san finds a way to get Siu-siu to resolve his department's invoice issues when he hints that her best friend Chiu Lei-hung's (Angela Tong) job might be on the line. Since then, Siu-siu has assumed Hiu-san is biased against her and wants to get back at her for her insults at their earlier meeting. Lei-hung, an unruly worker and slacker, begins working harder, knowing that she might be out of a job soon. Seeing Hiu-san's success in getting Lei-hung to change, Siu-siu ask him for advice on how to handle Lei-hung, since her unemployed make-up artist uncle, Lam Yi-mak (Power Chan), who lives with her, has a similar personality to Lei-hung. Siu-siu learns that Hiu-san does have a softer side when she coincidentally meets his father Koo Lik-hang (Chung King-fai) after losing her cellular phone.

Siu-siu is tricked by her co-worker into transferring out of the accounting department, as she thinks someone will be fired because of company budget issues. Due to her kindness towards her co-workers, she volunteers to leave the accounting department and interviews for all available positions within TVI, even Hiu-san's longtime unfilled executive secretary position. During her interview, Siu-siu does not expect Hiu-san to hire her because of their past clashes, so she gives an honest opinion about him and his department during her interview. Siu-siu is devastated when she finds out her co-worker had been wanting to take her position, but her day however ends on a high note when Hiu-San offers her the executive secretary position and lets her know her salary will be higher than what she is currently making as an accountant.

Cast

Main cast
Teresa Mo as Lam Siu-siu (林小小)
Wayne Lai as Koo Hiu-san (古曉臣)
Power Chan as Lam Yi-mak (林以默)
Angela Tong as Chiu Lei-hung (趙麗虹)
Chung King-fai as Koo Lik-hang (古力行)
Florence Kwok as Wan Fei-fei (雲飛飛)
Jeannie Chan as young Wan Fei-fei (青年)
Eric Li as Ryan Cha Wai-yan (卓威仁)
William Hu as Ciu Wai (招偉)
Mark Ma as Tong Chong-shu (唐中書)
Amisha Ng as Ka Lei (嘉莉)
Kalok Chow as Ah Tong (阿潼)
Veronica Shiu as Yan Yan (殷欣)
Ricco Ng as Lam Wo (林禾)
Jessica Kan as Elsa (袁冰冰)

Extended Cast
Kimmy Kwan as Daisy (劉愛思) 
Jan Tse as Christy
Jimmy Au as K.C.
Kim Li as Terry
Hebe Chan as Bonnie (劉可怡)
Aurora Li as 蚊蚊 (施敏)
Roxanne Tong as Yan
Hero Yuen as 阿齊 (鍾　齊)
Glen Lee as 明哥 (江　明)
Stephen Ho as 申監製 (申　聲)
Joseph Yeung as Wilson (時天信)
Mandy Lam as Dina
Vicky Chan as Coco 
KK Cheung as Jason Yu (余總理)

Guest star
Anthony Wong as Himself

Development
In early February 2016, TVB announced that the highly popular Come Home Love series would be coming to an end with final episode to be broadcast April 1, 2016 and announcing Wayne Lai and Teresa Mo to be headlining the upcoming series to takeover the timeslot.
Power Chan had declined to renew his contract with TVB in October 2015 in order to explore other work option outside of TVB but decided to return to TVB when female lead Teresa Mo offered him a role in the new sitcom.

Viewership Ratings

See also
Come Home Love
Come Home Love (series 2)

References

External links
Official website 

TVB dramas
2016 Hong Kong television series debuts